Parides panthonus, the panthonus cattleheart, is a butterfly of the family Papilionidae. It is found in the Guianas and Suriname.

Subspecies
P. p. panthonus (Suriname, the Guianas)
P. p. barbotini Brévignon, 1998 (eastern French Guiana)
P. p. phylarchus (Hopffer, 1865) (French Guiana)

Description from Seitz

[Red instead of white marginal spots. The hind tibiae of the males are always dilated and with fine hairs. The species The 
red spots on the hindwing have no opalescent gloss]  P. panthonus. Forewing in both sexes black, with reddish marginal 
spots; hindwing with a regularly curved row of separated red spots. Scent-wool white. Guiana and [following text refers to Parides burchellanus (Westwood, 1872) Brazil, in two subspecies. —numa Boisd. (= jaguarae Foett), from Brazil (São Paulo and Minas Geraes), has small, widely separated spots. — In panthonus Cr. (3 b, 5 a), from the three Guianas, the spots on the hindwing are somewhat larger. This form most probably occurs also on the north side of the Lower Amazon] .

Description from Rothschild and Jordan(1906)

A full description is provided by Rothschild, W. and Jordan, K. (1906) Note Papilio numa Boisduval, 1836 is Parides burchellanus jaguarae (Foetterle, 1902)

Taxonomy

Parides panthonus is a member of the aeneas species group

The members are
Parides aeneas 
Parides aglaope 
Parides burchellanus 
Parides echemon 
Parides eurimedes 
Parides lysander 
Parides neophilus 
Parides orellana 
Parides panthonus 
Parides tros 
Parides zacynthus

References

Parides
Butterflies described in 1780
Papilionidae of South America